This article displays the squads for the 2020 European Men's Handball Championship. Each team consisted of up to 28 players, of whom 16 may be fielded for each match.

Age, club, caps and goals as of 9 January 2020.

Group A

Belarus
A 17-player squad was announced on 26 December 2019. On 2 January Uladzislau Kulesh, Aliaksandr Padshyvalau and Mikalai Aliokhin were added to the squad. The final squad was announced on 6 January 2020.

Head coach: Yuri Shevtsov

Croatia
A 18-player squad was announced on 30 December 2019. The final squad was announced on 7 January 2020.

Head coach: Lino Červar

Montenegro
The squad was announced 22 December 2019. On 5 January 2020, Miloš Vujović was replaced by Filip Vujović due to an injury.

Head coach: Zoran Roganović

Serbia
The squad was revealed on 30 December 2018.

Head coach: Nenad Peruničić

Group B

Austria
An 18-player squad was revealed on 30 December 2019. The final squad was announced on 7 January 2020.

Head coach:  Aleš Pajovič

Czech Republic
An 18-player squad was announced on 30 December 2019. The final squad was announced on 7 January 2020.

Head coach: Jan Filip

North Macedonia
A 20-player squad was announced 30 December 2019. The final squad was announced on 8 January 2020.

Head coach: Danilo Brestovac

Ukraine
The squad was announced on 28 December 2019.

Head coach: Serhiy Bebeshko

Group C

Germany
A 17-player squad was announced on 20 December 2019. Franz Semper withdrew on 31 December 2019, due to an injury and was replaced by David Schmidt. The final squad was announced on 8 January 2020. Johannes Golla replaced Marian Michalczik on 16 January 2020.

Head coach: Christian Prokop

Latvia
The squad was announced on 30 December 2019.

Head coach: Armands Uščins

Netherlands
A 16-player squad was announced on 28 November 2019. The final squad was announced on 5 January 2020.

Head coach:  Erlingur Richardsson

Spain
An 18-player squad was announced on 30 December 2019. The final squad was announced on 5 January 2020.

Head coach: Jordi Ribera

Group D

Bosnia and Herzegovina
A 28-player squad was revealed on 6 December 2019. The final squad was announced on 7 January 2020.

Head coach: Bilal Šuman

France
An 18-player squad was revealed on 30 December 2019. The final squad was announced on 6 January 2020.

Head coach: Didier Dinart

Norway
An 18-player squad was announced on 9 December 2019. On 25 December 2019, Bjarte Myrhol was replaced by Tom Kåre Nikolaisen due to a health problem. The final squad was announced on 10 January 2020. On 20 January, Espen Christensen replaced Magnus Abelvik Rød due to an injury. On 22 January, William Aar replaced Kristian Sæverås due to sickness.

Head coach: Christian Berge

Portugal
The squad was announced on 30 December 2019.

Head coach: Paulo Pereira

Group E

Denmark
The squad was announced on 16 December 2019. On 13 January Morten Olsen replaced Jacob Holm. On 15 January Magnus Landin Jacobsen replaced Lasse Andersson

Head coach: Nikolaj Jacobsen

Hungary
A 22-player squad was announced on 13 December 2019. On 2 January 2020 the squad was reduced to 20 players. The final squad was announced on 5 January 2020.

Head coach: István Gulyás

Iceland
A 19-player squad was announced on 16 December 2019. The final squad was announced on 7 January 2020.

Head coach: Guðmundur Guðmundsson

Russia
A 22-player squad was announced on 24 December 2019. On 1 January 2020 the squad was reduced to 18 players.

Head coach: Eduard Koksharov

Group F

Poland
A 19-player squad was announced on 31 December 2019. The final squad was announced on 6 January 2020. On 14 January Jan Czuwara replaced Przemysław Krajewski due to an injury.

Head coach: Patryk Rombel

Slovenia
A 20-player squad was announced on 29 December 2019. The final squad was announced on 5 January 2020.

Head coach:  Ljubomir Vranjes

Sweden
The squad was announced on 13 December 2019.

Head coach: Kristján Andrésson

Switzerland
A 19-player squad was announced on 11 December 2019. The final squad was announced on 8 January 2020.

Head coach: Michael Suter

Statistics

Player representation by league system
In all, European Championship squad members play for clubs in 31 different countries.

Coaches representation by country
Coaches in bold represent their own country.

References

External links
Official website

Squads
European Handball Championship squads